The 2011 WGC-Accenture Match Play Championship was a professional golf tournament played from February , 2011 at the Ritz-Carlton Golf Club at Dove Mountain in Marana, Arizona, northwest of Tucson. It was the 13th WGC-Accenture Match Play Championship and the first of four World Golf Championships held in 2011.

Luke Donald won his only WGC title with a 3 & 2 win in the final over runner-up Martin Kaymer. Four previous winners lost in the first round, including defending champion Ian Poulter and three-time winner Tiger Woods.

Format change
A change in the final round format was instituted for 2011; it was shortened from 36 holes to 18 holes, and the semi-finals were moved to Sunday morning from Saturday afternoon. With snow forecasted for early Sunday, the quarterfinals and semifinals were played on Saturday and the finals and consolation match were played Sunday.

Past champions in the field

2011 course layout

Brackets
The championship was a single elimination match play event. The field consisted of the top 64 players available from the Official World Golf Ranking as of the February 13 ranking, seeded according to the rankings.

All of the top 64 golfers were in the field initially. Toru Taniguchi (ranked #64) withdrew due to neck injury and was replaced by Henrik Stenson (#65). Tim Clark (#22) withdrew due to an elbow injury and his place in the bracket was taken by J. B. Holmes (#66).

Bobby Jones bracket

Ben Hogan bracket

Gary Player bracket

Sam Snead bracket

Final Four

Breakdown by country

Prize money breakdown

 Source:

Notes and references

External links

Coverage on the European Tour's official site

WGC Match Play
Golf in Arizona
WGC-Accenture Match Play Championship
WGC-Accenture Match Play Championship
WGC-Accenture Match Play Championship